All Saints' Episcopal Church is an Episcopal church in Atlanta, Georgia. The church was founded in 1903, with the current building constructed in 1906.

History 
In the early 1900s, Episcopalians in what is now midtown Atlanta petitioned the Episcopal Diocese of Georgia to establish a new church in midtown. During this time, the city of Atlanta was growing and expanding northward, and Episcopalians in the northern parts of the city wanted a place of worship closer to them than the churches in downtown Atlanta, which at the time included what would become the Episcopal Cathedral of Saint Philip. In 1901, Mary Jane Thompson Peters, the widow of prominent Atlanta businessman Richard Peters, donated land for the construction of a new church. This parcel, located at the intersection of North Avenue and West Peachtree Street, had previously been a part of Peters Park, a planned but never realized neighborhood in Atlanta that became much of the main campus of the Georgia Institute of Technology.

On April 11, 1903, a cornerstone for a church building at the site was placed, with Holy Communion first held at the church on May 31 of that year with 45 members. This building, a wooden structure, was designed by Harriett Dozier, one of the few women architects active at this time. In 1906, this building was demolished and replaced with a Gothic sandstone building. This building was designed by the architectural firm of Thomas Henry Morgan and John Robert Dillon. Service was first held in this building on April 8, 1906, and it was consecrated two years later on December 9, 1908. This current structure features several large stained glass windows, several of which are from Tiffany & Co.

In 2003, the church commissioned a new pipe organ from American-based John-Paul Buzard Pipe Organ Builders, the Opus 29. In 2020, American businesswoman and diplomat Anne Cox Chambers's funeral was held at All Saints'.

References

Bibliography

External links 

Episcopal church buildings in Georgia (U.S. state)
Churches in Atlanta
Churches completed in 1906
1906 establishments in Georgia (U.S. state)